The 1964 Army Cadets football team represented the United States Military Academy during the 1964 NCAA University Division football season. Seven players from this team later fought in the Vietnam War.

Schedule

Roster
Rollie Stichweh

Game summaries

Navy

References

Army
Army Black Knights football seasons
Army Cadets football